or Ode to Joy is a Japanese film released in 2006 and based on the true story of the Bandō prisoner-of-war camp in World War I. It depicts the friendship of the German POWs with the director of the camp and local residents at the stage of Naruto, Tokushima Prefecture in Japan.

The film, which explores the cultural interactions between the prisoners and the Japanese, starred Swiss actor Bruno Ganz and Ken Matsudaira. It was directed by Masanobu Deme. Baruto no Gakuen is also called "The Bearded Orchestra". This title was derived from the Bandō camp's commandant, Toyohisa Matsue, who was noted for his "imposing" Wilhelmine beard.

See also
Germany–Japan relations

References

External links
Internet Archive retrieval of the official web site as it was on the 12th of February 2006 
Ode an die Freude 

2006 films
World War I prisoner of war films
Toei Company films
2000s Japanese films